The 2013 season was Perak's 10th consecutive season in the Malaysian Super League.

Players

First team squad

Transfers

In

First transfer window

Out

First transfer window

Second transfer window

Loan in

Second transfer window

Competitions

Super League

FA Cup

The draw was held at Wisma FAM on 10 December 2012.

Malaysia Cup

Group stage

The matchdays were 20–31 August, and 17–21 September 2013.

Statistics

Top scorers
The list is sorted by shirt number when total goals are equal.
{| class="wikitable sortable" style="font-size: 95%; text-align: center;"
|-
!width=10|
!width=10|
!width=10|
!width=150|Player
!width=50|Super League
!width=50|FA Cup
!width=50|Malaysia Cup
!width=50|Total
|-
|1
|FW
|10
|align=left| Paulo Rangel
|9||0||2||11
|-
|2
|FW
|7
|align=left| Azlan Ismail
|3||0||1||4
|-
|3
|FW
|14
|align=left| Abdul Hadi Yahya
|3||0||0||3
|-
|rowspan="2"|4
|DF
|19
|align=left| Hazrul Mustafa
|1||0||1||2
|-
|MF
|20
|align=left| Rafiuddin Rodin
|2||0||0||2
|-
|rowspan="5"|6
|FW
|
|align=left| Khairul Asyraf
|0||0||1||1
|-
|MF
|15
|align=left| Yong Kuong Yong
|0||0||1||1
|-
|FW
|12
|align=left| Failee Ghazli
|1||0||0||1
|-
|FW
|10
|align=left| Karim Rouani
|1||0||0||1
|-
|DF
|5
|align=left| Shahrom Kalam
|1||0||0||1
|-
|#
|colspan="3"|Own goals
|2
|0
|0
|1 
|-class="sortbottom"
|colspan=4|Total
|23
|0
|6
|29

References

Perak F.C. seasons
Perak FA